The following is a list of twice-baked foods. Twice-baked foods are foods that are baked twice in their preparation. Baking is a food cooking method using prolonged dry heat acting by convection, and not by thermal radiation, normally in an oven, but also in hot ashes, or on hot stones. When the desired temperature is reached within the heating instrument, the food is placed inside and baked for a certain amount of time. Such items are sometimes referred to as "baked goods," and are sold at a bakery.

Twice-baked foods

See also

 List of baked goods
 List of cookies and biscuits
 List of cooking techniques
 Outline of food preparation
 Pommes soufflées
 Triple Cooked Chips

References

Cooking techniques
Twice Baked